Lake Ann is a village in northeastern Benzie County in the U.S. state of Michigan. The population of Lake Ann was 273 at the 2020 census.

History 
The first family to settle on Lake Ann was the family of Addison P. Wheelock, who name the lake after his wife.

Lake Ann was organized in 1893, and incorporated in 1914. It was once a station on the Manistee and North-Eastern Railroad, which has since been removed.

The Lake Ann Camp, a Christian summer camp, was established just west of Lake Ann in 1948.

Geography

Lake Ann lies upon the northern shore of the lake of the same name. Lake Ann itself is a basin that lies along the Platte River, which flows west to Lake Michigan.

Lake Ann contains no state trunkline highways, although Benzie County signs County Roads 610 (Maple Street), 665 (Lake Ann Road), and 667 (Reynolds Road) through the village.

Demographics

2010 census
As of the census of 2010, there were 268 people, 118 households, and 76 families residing in the village. The racial makeup of the village was 95.1% White, 0.4% African American, 1.5% Native American, 0.4% from other races, and 2.6% from two or more races. Hispanic or Latino of any race were 0.4% of the population.

There were 118 households, of which 22.0% had children under the age of 18 living with them, 59.3% were married couples living together, 4.2% had a female householder with no husband present, 0.8% had a male householder with no wife present, and 35.6% were non-families. 30.5% of all households were made up of individuals, and 7.6% had someone living alone who was 65 years of age or older. The average household size was 2.27 and the average family size was 2.80.

The median age in the village was 48.2 years. 16.8% of residents were under the age of 18; 7.8% were between the ages of 18 and 24; 18.7% were from 25 to 44; 38% were from 45 to 64; and 18.7% were 65 years of age or older. The gender makeup of the village was 48.1% male and 51.9% female.

2000 census
As of the census of 2000, there were 276 people, 113 households, and 81 families residing in the village. The racial makeup of the village was 97.46% White, 0.72% Native American, 0.36% Asian, 0.36% from other races, and 1.09% from two or more races. Hispanic or Latino of any race were 1.81% of the population.

There were 113 households, out of which 24.8% had children under the age of 18 living with them, 60.2% were married couples living together, 9.7% had a female householder with no husband present, and 28.3% were non-families. 22.1% of all households were made up of individuals, and 9.7% had someone living alone who was 65 years of age or older.  The average household size was 2.44 and the average family size was 2.84.

In the village, the population was spread out, with 20.7% under the age of 18, 9.1% from 18 to 24, 26.8% from 25 to 44, 23.9% from 45 to 64, and 19.6% who were 65 years of age or older.  The median age was 42 years. For every 100 females, there were 91.7 males.  For every 100 females age 18 and over, there were 92.1 males.

The median income for a household in the village was $42,917, and the median income for a family was $46,944. Males had a median income of $31,563 versus $19,583 for females. The per capita income for the village was $17,387.  None of the families and 4.8% of the population were living below the poverty line, including no under eighteens and 8.0% of those over 64.

Education
The Lake Ann area is divided between the Benzie Central Schools and Traverse City Area Public Schools districts. The nearest public elementary school is Lake Ann Elementary School, part of the Benzie Central Schools district. However, the nearest public secondary school is Traverse City West Senior High School, which is part of the Traverse City Area Public Schools district.

Government 
The village president of Lake Ann is Dan Hawkins. The village is, as of 2023, governed by Hawkins, treasurer Mandy Gray-Rineer, clerk Tammy Clous, and trustees Jess Bocian, Vince Edwards, Christi Grant-Wagner, and Joe Harrison.

References 

Villages in Benzie County, Michigan
Villages in Michigan
Traverse City micropolitan area